Urticicola umbrosus is a species of air-breathing land snail, a terrestrial pulmonate gastropod mollusk in the family Hygromiidae, the hairy snails and their allies.

Description
The height of the shell varies between 5.5 mm and 7 mm; its width varies between 10 mm and 13 mm.

The thin shell is fragile and translucent. It is turbinately globose, closely wound. The spire has a flat and conical shape. It contains 5½ whorls. The periphery of the last one shows a blunt ridge, that disappears before it reaches the aperture. The aperture is obliquely lunate. The umbilicus is very wide and measures about half the width of the shell.

Distribution
This species occurs primarily in mountain forests in Austria, Germany, Italy, Switzerland and Slovenia.

References

 Bank, R. A.; Neubert, E. (2017). Checklist of the land and freshwater Gastropoda of Europe. Last update: July 16th, 2017
 Sysoev, A. V. & Schileyko, A. A. (2009). Land snails and slugs of Russia and adjacent countries. Sofia/Moskva (Pensoft). 312 pp., 142 plates.

External links
 Pfeiffer, C. (1821-1828). Naturgeschichte deutscher Land- und Süsswasser-Mollusken. Weimar. 

Hygromiidae
Gastropods described in 1828